Józef Pokutyński (1859–1929) was a Polish architect.

1859 births
1929 deaths
Architects from Kraków